Upper Glady School is a historic one-room school building located near Crawford, Lewis County, West Virginia.  It was built about 1900, and is a frame building measuring 28 feet by 24 feet and painted white.  Also on the property is a coal house used to store coal for fuel.  The school operated until 1965.

It was listed on the National Register of Historic Places in 2002.

References

Defunct schools in West Virginia
Educational institutions disestablished in 1965
Former school buildings in the United States
National Register of Historic Places in Lewis County, West Virginia
One-room schoolhouses in West Virginia
School buildings completed in 1900
Schools in Lewis County, West Virginia
School buildings on the National Register of Historic Places in West Virginia
1900 establishments in West Virginia